The 1984 Summer Olympics torch relay was run from May 8 until July 28, prior to the 1984 Summer Olympics in Los Angeles. Rafer Johnson lit the cauldron at the opening ceremony. The Los Angeles Olympic Organizing Committee (LAOOC) tasked Burson-Marsteller, the public relations agency of AT&T, with the organization of the relay. The Youth Legacy Kilometer pioneered the idea of runners being nominated by the public.

The torch relay saw many firsts, including people from all over the country participating and raising millions of dollars that were donated to charities.

Torch

Etched on the ring of the torch were the words of the Olympic motto ("Citius, Altius, Fortius") with the Olympic rings between each word. They were manufactured by Turner Industries and each one was numbered.

During an 800-mile trial run the original design of the torch was found to be flawed. The valve was found to be recessed too deeply inside the bowl of the torch and was extinguished too easily. The type of propane and the valve used for its release were also adjusted to ensure that it would remain lit wherever possible.

Organization
The relay was organized by Burson-Marsteller, the PR agency of AT&T, which also sponsored the relay and provided the majority of the staffing for the events. Runner uniforms were provided by Levi Strauss with Converse supplying the shoes.

The Los Angeles Olympic Organizing Committee (LAOOC) referred to the relay as being "an overwhelming success", achieving the two goals of spreading the Olympics around the country and providing a legacy for youth sport programs. They estimated that around a quarter of the United States population witnessed the relay.

Youth Legacy Kilometer
Torchbearers came from a wide variety of backgrounds and the aim was to introduce a level of egalitarianism. The 1984 relay was the first to invite nominations from the public, a system replicated in future relays. It was also the first to charge torchbearers for their participation, with the fee working out at around $3,000 per kilometer. Anybody who could raise the entry fee would be able to sponsor one kilometer and bear a torch themselves or designate a person to do so. The scheme, called the "Youth Legacy Kilometer" (YLK) raised nearly $11 million, all of which was given to charities. YMCA received the largest proportion of the funds, amounting to around $3.9 million. Sections that did not receive sponsorship were completed by volunteers from AT&T. Prior to the 1984 Olympics, only “selected” people were allowed to carry the torch. That changed in LA as in the US any person could become the torchbearer.

Caesar's Tahoe Hotel Casino ran a drawing, in which customers could win a place in the relay. The company sponsored 50 kilometers of the Nevada route and gave seven of these runs to winning customers and 42 to local organizations. The remaining kilometer was given to 1976 Decathlon winner Bruce Jenner who had signed a promotional contract with the company.

The Hellenic Olympic Committee (HOC), unhappy with what they considered to be the commercialization of the torch relay, threatened to stop the event from happening. Several months of negotiations finally finished in an agreement just days before the planned kindling ceremony. On May 7, 1984, the lighting ceremony took place.

Route

The LAOOC originally hoped that the relay would visit all 50 states and capitals as well as Washington D.C. They realized that this would require a 24-hour-per-day operation and had to reduce the scope of their plans to include 33 states:

{| class=wikitable
!Location
!Map
|-
|
New York City
New Haven
Providence
Boston
Hartford
Trenton
Philadelphia
Wilmington
Baltimore
Annapolis
Washington, D.C.
Pittsburgh
|
|-
|
Cleveland
Toledo
Detroit
Chicago
Indianapolis
Louisville
|
|-
|
Knoxville
Atlanta
Birmingham
Memphis
St. Louis
Kansas City
Tulsa
Oklahoma City
Dallas
|
|-
|
Albuquerque
Colorado Springs
Denver
Salt Lake City
Boise
Seattle
Portland
Reno
Sacramento
San Francisco
Oakland
San Jose
Los Angeles
San Diego
Los Angeles Memorial Coliseum
|

|}

The relay officially began on May 8 with Bill Thorpe, Jr., grandson of Jim Thorpe, and Gina Hemphill, granddaughter of Jesse Owens, being given the honor of becoming the first torchbearers.

Opening ceremony

Rafer Johnson, an Olympic decathlon gold medalist, was the final torchbearer.

References

Torch Relay, 1984 Summer Olympics
Olympic torch relays